Matthias Dolderer (born 15 September 1970 in Ochsenhausen, Baden Württemberg) is a German professional race pilot. He is the 2016 champion of the Red Bull Air Race.

Flying career

Beginnings
Dolderer, who once colourfully compared the precision-flying of the Red Bull Air Race to trying to park a car in a garage while travelling at nearly 400 kilometres per hour, first went flying with his father when he was three years old. He was raised at his parents' flight school and at the early age of five became hooked on machines and fast cars making his first solo flight at 14. His life has revolved around aviation ever since. "Flying was my passion from the very first moment and my inspiration. I've spent my whole life in hangars, on airfields and in cockpits," says Dolderer.

He gained a glider and ultralight license at the age of 17 and the following year obtained his private pilot's license. Just a few days later he finished 3rd in the German Championships. From 1988 until 1991, Matthias Dolderer took part in four German and two European Championships, and the World Championships as a member of the national ultralight team. He ended his ultralight aviator career as the German Champion.

At 21 he became the youngest flight teacher in Germany. He and his sister Verena took over Tannheim Airfield to continue their family's vision: 'To establish a meeting place for aviators, enthusiasts, amateurs as well as professionals.' The legendary Tannkosh event, Europe's biggest Fly-In, became a reality in 1993.

Dolderer has spent almost 300 days of his life in the cockpit in more than 150 different aircraft types, with 25,000 landings all over the world and has performed in many air shows across Europe since 1993.

Competition aerobatics
In 2006, Matthias Dolderer intensified his aerobatic activities to become a Red Bull Air Race pilot in the near future. Just one year later, he took part at the World Aerobatic Championship, category "Unlimited". In 2008, Dolderer made his breakthrough after hard training. He won the German Aerobatic Championship and achieved also top standings at international competitions such as the World Aerobatics Cup.

Red Bull Air Race pilot
Matthias Dolderer's achievements opened him the way for an invitation to attend the Red Bull Air Race qualification camp in Casarrubios, Spain, at the end of September 2008. Of the six candidates, five qualified for the "super license" required to compete in the world championship. Matthias Dolderer was one of four rookies selected for active race status. He flies a white Zivko Edge 540 V3 with the German colours of red, black and yellow on his tail and winglets. He flies under the number 21.

Achievements

2009-2010

2014- 

Legend: * CAN: Cancelled * DNP: Did not take part * DNS: Did not start * DSQ: Disqualified * DNF: Did Not Finish

2008
 European Aerobatic Championships, "Unlimited" Category, 19th Place
 World Aerobatics Cup, Czech Republic, "Unlimited" Category, 2nd place
 German Aerobatic Championships, "Unlimited" Category, 1st place
 German Aerobatic Championships, 4-minute freestyle program, 2nd place
 Qualified at the Red Bull Air Race Qualification Camp and selected to race in 2009
2007
 Participation German Aerobatic Championships "Unlimited" Category
 Participation World Aerobatics Championships "Unlimited" Category
2006
 Participation German Aerobatic Championship, "Advanced" Category
1991
 Microlight European Championships, German Champion
1990
 Microlight World Championships
1988
 Microlight European Championships
1988 till 1991
 Microlight German Championships

See also
 Competition aerobatics
 FAI

References

External links

 Matthias Dolderer – Official Website
 Red Bull Air Race World Championship – Official Website
 Air Races

1970 births
Living people
People from Ochsenhausen
Sportspeople from Tübingen (region)
Aerobatic pilots
German air racers
Red Bull Air Race World Championship pilots
German flight instructors